Joe Salem (born January 30, 1987) is an American soccer player who last played with the Puerto Rico Islanders.

Career

Youth and college
Salem attended St. Vincent – St. Mary High School, where he was named 1st Team All-Tri County as a sophomore and junior and 1st Team All-District as a junior. He played five seasons of club soccer for the Cleveland United club team, leading them team to a US Regional Club runner-up finish and to a Northern Ohio Cup title. He played five years of college soccer at the University of Tulsa, redshirting his freshman year. He received NSCAA/adidas NCAA All-Midwest First Team accolades as a junior in 2008, as well as 1st Team All-Conference USA, Conference USA All-Tournament Team, collegesoccernews.com's National Team of the Week, Conference USA All-Academic Honoree, and University of Tulsa's Student Athlete of the Month. Joe was selected to the MAC Hermann Trophy watch list prior to his senior season, including Preseason Conference USA 1st Team honors. During his time at Tulsa, the Golden Hurricane won 3 consecutive Conference USA Regular Season and Tournament Championships and went to 3 NCAA tournaments, advancing to the Elite 8 in 2009.

During his college years Salem also played with Des Moines Menace in the USL Premier Development League. Joe was selected 1st Team All-Central Conference in 2008 and helped lead the team to the 2009 Heartland Conference Championship and advance to the Elite 8

Professional
Undrafted out of college, Salem turned professional in 2010 when he signed with the Puerto Rico Islanders of the USSF D2 Pro League. 
He made his professional debut on April 16, 2010, in a 2010 CFU Club Championship game against Haitian side Racing des Gonaïves, and made his league debut on April 21, 2010, in a game against NSC Minnesota Stars.

Honors

Puerto Rico Islanders
CFU Club Championship Winner (1): 2010

References

External links
 Tulsa bio
 Des Moines Menace bio

1987 births
Living people
American soccer players
Soccer players from Akron, Ohio
Puerto Rico Islanders players
Des Moines Menace players
Tulsa Golden Hurricane men's soccer players
USL League Two players
USSF Division 2 Professional League players
North American Soccer League players
Association football midfielders
St. Vincent–St. Mary High School alumni
Louisville Cardinals men's soccer coaches